Eupithecia fuscorufa is a moth   in the family Geometridae. It is found in Pakistan.

References

Moths described in 2012
fuscorufa
Moths of Asia